"A Choice of Kings" is a television drama film and stage play by John Mortimer. It was first produced in 1966 in the ITV Play of the Week series, directed by John Frankau, starring Michael Craig.

Outline
The action is set at the court of Edward the Confessor, two years before the Battle of Hastings, and offers an unexpected explanation of the background to the quarrel between Harold Godwinson and William the Conqueror and the Norman invasion of England.

Production and screenplay
The first production, by Rediffusion, was timed to commemorate the 900th anniversary of the Battle of Hastings, fought on 14 October 1066 and was first broadcast on 11 October, in the week of the original battle.

John Mortimer's script was published in Playbill 3 (1966), together with other screenplays by Alan Plater, Ray Jenkins, Ronald Duncan, and Alan Gosling. Having been published, the screenplay is sometimes performed on stage. There was a production by Ampleforth College in 1974.

Reception
A review in the Birmingham Daily Post commented ”John Mortimer's play A Choice of Kings (ITV, Tuesday) was dead as a drama, but half revived by its whimsical touches. The Liverpool Echo drew attention to a minor detail, ”For Harold, as can be seen to-night on ITV in a new John Mortimer play, A Choice of Kings, was vain enough to wear a Diana Dors bob of golden shoulder-length hair.

Cast
 Michael Craig as Harold Godwinson, Earl of Wessex
 Barbara Ewing as Edith Swan-neck, Harold's wife
 Julian Glover as William the Bastard, Duke of Normandy
 Amaryllis Garnett as Judith of Balbec, William's cousin
 Peter Jeffrey as Bishop Odo
 John Bailey as FitzOsbern 
 Christopher Guinee as Theobald
 Michael Wennink as Wolfnoth, Harold's younger brother

Notes

External links
 

1966 television plays
Works set in the 10th century
ITV Play of the Week
Cultural depictions of William the Conqueror